Musical symbols are marks and symbols in musical notation that indicate various aspects of how a piece of music is to be performed. There are symbols to communicate information about many musical elements, including pitch, duration, dynamics, or articulation of musical notes; tempo, metre, form (e.g., whether sections are repeated), and details about specific playing techniques (e.g., which fingers, keys, or pedals are to be used, whether a string instrument should be bowed or plucked, or whether the bow of a string instrument should move up or down).

Lines

Clefs 

A clef assigns one particular pitch to one particular line of the staff on which it is placed. This also effectively defines the pitch range or tessitura of the music on that staff. A clef is usually the leftmost symbol on a staff, although a different clef may appear elsewhere to indicate a change in register. Historically, clefs could be placed on any line on a staff (or even on a space), but modern notation almost exclusively uses treble, bass, alto, and tenor clef.

Rhythmic values of notes and rests 

In American usage, musical note and rest values have names that indicate their length relative to a whole note. A half note is half the length of a whole note, a quarter note is one quarter the length, etc.

Breaks

Accidentals and key signatures

Common accidentals 
Accidentals modify the pitch of the notes that follow them on the same staff position within a measure, unless cancelled by an additional accidental.

Key signatures
Key signatures indicate which notes are to be played as sharps or flats in the music that follows, showing up to seven sharps or flats. Notes that are shown as sharp or flat in a key signature will be played that way in every octave—e.g., a key signature with a B indicates that every B is played as a B. A key signature indicates the prevailing key of the music and eliminates the need to use accidentals for the notes that are always flat or sharp in that key. A key signature with no flats or sharps generally indicates the key of C major or A minor, but can also indicate that pitches will be notated with accidentals as required. The key signature examples shown here are as they would appear in treble clef.

Flat key signatures

Sharp key signatures

Microtones 
There is no universally accepted notation for microtonal music, with varying systems being used depending on the situation. A common notation for quarter tones involves writing the fraction  next to an arrow pointing up or down. Below are other forms of notation:

A symbol with one vertical and three diagonal bars indicates a sharp with some form of alternate tuning.

In 19 equal temperament, where a whole tone is divided into three steps instead of two, music is typically notated in a way that flats and sharps are not usually enharmonic (thus a C represents a third of a step lower than D); this has the advantage of not requiring any nonstandard notation.

Time signatures 

Most music has a rhythmic pulse with a uniform number of beats—each segment of this pulse is shown as a measure. Time signatures indicate the number of beats in each measure (the top number) and also show what type of note represents a single beat (the bottom number). There may be any number of beats in a measure but the most common by far are multiples of 2 and/or 3 (i.e., 2, 3, 4, and 6). Likewise, any note length can be used to represent a beat, but a quarter note (indicated by a bottom number of "4") or eighth note (bottom number of "8") are by far the most common.

Note relationships

Dynamics 

Dynamics are indicators of the relative intensity or volume of a musical line.

Rarely, even softer or louder dynamic levels are indicated by adding more s or s.

Dynamics are relative, and the meaning of each level is at the discretion of the performer or the conductor. Laws to curb high noise levels in the workplace have changed the interpretation of very loud dynamics in some large orchestral works, as noise levels within the orchestra itself can easily exceed safe levels.

Articulation marks 
Articulations specify the length, volume, and style of attack of individual notes. This category includes accents. Articulations can be combined with one another and may appear in conjunction with phrasing marks (above). Any of these markings may be placed either above or below a note.

Ornaments 
Ornaments modify the pitch pattern of individual notes.

Octave signs 

8va and 15ma are sometimes abbreviated further to 8 and 15. When they appear below the staff, the word bassa is sometimes added.

Repetition and codas

Instrument-specific notation

Bowed string instruments

Guitar 

The guitar has a fingerpicking notation system derived from the names of the fingers in Spanish or Latin. They are written above, below, or beside the note to which they are attached. They read as follows:

Piano

Pedal marks 
Pedal marks appear in music for instruments with sustain pedals, such as the piano, vibraphone and chimes.

Other piano notation 

Old (pre-1940) tutors published in the UK may use "English fingering". + for thumb, then 1 (index), 2 (middle), 3 (ring) and 4 (little).

Other stringed instruments 
(With the exception of harp)

See also Fingerstyle guitar#Notation.

Harp 
Fingering numbers are similar to piano, except there is no 5 as the little finger is not used in playing the harp.

1 = thumb, 2 = index finger, 3 = middle finger, 4 = ring finger.

Four-mallet percussion

Six-mallet percussion

Numbers for six-mallet percussion may be reversed as well.

Organ
The organ has many different abbreviations for its keyboards in European languages.

See also
Singing
Musical instruments
Cluster
Graphic notation
Music theory
Glossary of musical terminology
Musical Symbols (Unicode block)
Shape note
Musical Symbols (disambiguation)

References

Further reading
Elaine Gould, Behind Bars – The Definitive Guide to Music Notation. Faber Music (publisher), 2011.

External links
Comprehensive list of music symbols fonts
Music theory & history (Dolmetsch Online)
Dictionary of musical symbols (Dolmetsch Online)
Sight reading tutorial with symbol variations Amy Appleby

 
Symbols